Get Busy Committee (a.k.a. GBC) was a hip hop group consisting of underground rapper Apathy, Styles of Beyond's Ryu, and producer Scoop DeVille.

Group Info
Get Busy Committee was formed in Los Angeles, California, by longtime friends Ryu, Apathy and Scoop DeVille.

They claim their influences come from Eazy-E, BBD (Bell Biv DeVoe), BDP (Boogie Down Productions). All production is done by Scoop DeVille and Apathy, while vocals are given by everyone in the group. Their debut album, Uzi Does It, was released for pre-sale download on October 27, 2009 at www.getbusycommittee.com, and available on iTunes and other outlets on November 10, 2009. The album is a 100% self-funded and self-released independent record.

Future

As of 2012, Get Busy Committee is on hiatus, or "dead" as they refer to the status of the group. A recorded album, Opening Ceremony, remains unreleased, while the group members focus on their solo careers.

Collaborations
 "Suicide Music" - from The Raid: Redemption by Mike Shinoda and Joseph Trapanese (2012)

Discography

Group releases

References

External links
 Get Busy Committee Website

American hip hop groups